Nathan Hoover (born May 24, 1997) is an American professional basketball player for BC Borisfen of the Belarusian Premier League. He played college basketball for Wofford.

High school career
Hoover grew up in Memphis, Tennessee. He attended Arlington High School, where he averaged 15 points per game as a sophomore. Hoover averaged more than 25 points per game during junior and senior seasons. He was one of three finalists for Tennessee Mr. Basketball as a senior. Hoover committed to play college basketball for Wofford, the first school to offer him a scholarship.

College career
In his collegiate debut, Hoover scored 18 points against LSU. Hoover averaged 7.8 points, and 2.4 rebounds per game as a freshman. He was named to the Southern Conference All-Freshman Team. As a sophomore, Hoover mainly came off the bench and averaged 11.0 points, 2.6 rebounds, and 1.4 assists per game. He helped Wofford reach the NCAA Tournament during his junior season, teaming with Fletcher Magee to form one of Division I's top three-point shooting pairs. Hoover was named to the SoCon All-Tournament Team. He averaged 13.6 points and 2.5 rebounds per game as a junior. On February 8, 2020, he scored a career-high 31 points in an 84–77 loss to Chattanooga. As a senior, Hoover averaged 14.7 points, 3.5 rebounds and 1.4 assists per game. He was named to the Second Team All-SoCon.

Professional career
Hoover signed his first professional contract with  BC Borisfen of the Belarusian Premier League on July 31, 2021.

Career statistics

College

|-
| style="text-align:left;"| 2016–17
| style="text-align:left;"| Wofford
|| 33 || 15 || 24.9 || .384 || .353 || .838 || 2.4 || 1.1 || .2 || .1 || 7.8
|-
| style="text-align:left;"| 2017–18
| style="text-align:left;"| Wofford
|| 34 || 18 || 27.1 || .425 || .405 || .831 || 2.6 || 1.4 || .6 || .1 || 11.0
|-
| style="text-align:left;"| 2018–19 
| style="text-align:left;"| Wofford
|| 35 || 35 || 28.6 || .457 || .469 || .906 || 2.5 || 1.0 || .6 || .0 || 13.6
|-
| style="text-align:left;"| 2019–20 
| style="text-align:left;"| Wofford 
|| 35 || 35 || 33.3 || .367 || .297 || .930 || 3.5 || 1.4 || .6 || .0 || 14.7
|- class="sortbottom"
| style="text-align:center;" colspan="2"| Career
|| 137 || 103 || 28.5 || .406 || .373 || .889 || 2.8 || 1.2 || 0.5 || 0.0 || 11.8

References

External links
 Wofford Terriers bio

1997 births
Living people
American men's basketball players
Basketball players from Memphis, Tennessee
Wofford Terriers men's basketball players
Shooting guards